Miklós Bonczos (Nagyszalonta, Hungary 16 September 1897 – Buenos Aires, Argentina 1 August 1971) was a Hungarian politician.
 1915: Graduated Ludovika military academy in 1915. 
 1919: Awarded Vitéz order for distinguished services in World War I.
 1925: Graduated Budapest University's Law School.
 1937: Csongrád county head.
 1939-1944: Member of the Parliament.
 17 August 1944 – 12 October 1944: Minister of the Interior for the Géza Lakatos administration. Due to health problems, could not fulfill his duties. Béla Horváth was appointed acting interior minister as state secretary on 9 September.

Bonczos left Hungary before the Soviet troops captured Budapest. He later emigrated to Argentina, where he died.

References
 Magyar Életrajzi Lexikon

1897 births
1971 deaths
People from Salonta
People from the Kingdom of Hungary
Hungarian Interior Ministers
Hungarian emigrants to Argentina